Robert Reyburn (4 January 1810–21 October 1892) was a New Zealand orchardist, farmer and politician. He was born in Kilmarnock, Ayrshire, Scotland in 1810.

References

1810 births
1892 deaths
People from Kilmarnock
New Zealand farmers
New Zealand horticulturists
New Zealand orchardists
Scottish emigrants to New Zealand
19th-century New Zealand politicians